Rubén Orlando Vallejos Gajardo (born 20 May 1967) is a Chilean former footballer and manager. He was most recently the head coach of Cobresal.

He is a highlighted goalscorer of the Chilean football in 1990s.

Personal life
As a football player, he was nicknamed Camión (Truck) due to his physical power.

Honours

Individual
 Campeonato Nacional (Chile) Top-Scorer: 1997–C 1

(1): "A" and "C" refer the Apertura and Clausura tournaments that divide the Chilean football champions.

References

External links
Rubén Vallejos at Footballdatabase

1967 births
Living people
People from Linares Province
Chilean footballers
Chilean expatriate footballers
Chilean Primera División players
Primera B de Chile players
Tercera División de Chile players
Ascenso MX players
Deportes Colchagua footballers
Magallanes footballers
General Velásquez footballers
Deportes Magallanes footballers
C.D. Antofagasta footballers
Colo-Colo footballers
Club Deportivo Palestino footballers
Unión Española footballers
Correcaminos UAT footballers
Puerto Montt footballers
Cobreloa footballers
Rangers de Talca footballers
Association football forwards
Chilean expatriate sportspeople in Mexico
Expatriate footballers in Mexico
Chilean football managers
Cobreloa managers
Rangers de Talca managers
Deportes Colchagua managers
Cobresal managers
Chilean Primera División managers
Primera B de Chile managers